The 2014 UK & Ireland Greyhound Racing Year was the 89th year of greyhound racing in the United Kingdom and Ireland.

Summary

Tracks
The most significant event of the year was the opening of a new track in the form of Towcester on 6 December 2014. Construction on the track had begun in March, backed by the Northamptonshire's racecourse owner Lord Hesketh. Leading trainers joined the track including five times champion trainer Mark Wallis, 2011 champion trainer Chris Allsopp, Kevin Hutton and Matt Dartnall.

The GRA was once again in the news, led by Managing Director Clive Feltham they supported a planning application for housing on Wimbledon Stadium which was against greyhound racing at the track, the other planning application by Paschal Taggart included the facility for greyhound racing. The company then sold the freehold on Belle Vue and Hall Green but retained a fifteen-year lease agreement (with a five-year mutual break clause). Belle Vue was purchased by the Crown Oil Pension Fund for 2.6 million and Hall Green was bought by Euro Property Investments for more than 3 million.

Another company in the spotlight would be Clarke Osborne's Gaming International, who owned Stadia UK, as planning permission was granted for 66 new houses on part of the existing Swindon Stadium site with the plan was to use some of the funds to build a new stadium and then the old site would be demolished for 450 homes.  Coventry greyhound racing closed suddenly after owner Harry Findlay pulled out, independent racing would take place at the venue at a later date.

Competitions
The blue riband races went to Salad Dodger, winner of the 2014 English Greyhound Derby and Laughil Blake triumphed in 2014 Irish Greyhound Derby. Following the Derby final there was a series of important announcements, the first came from William Hill who announced a huge sponsorship deal for the 2015 Derby. The winner would receive a record breaking £250,000 prize and then Boylesports stated that they would back the Irish Derby for three years.
In a closely fought battle at Sheffield, Paul Young claimed the trainer's championship after picking up three winners on the night with Jaytee China, Mollys Hope and Jaytee Lightning.

Ballymac Eske, arguably the fastest dog in racing, returned to action at Sheffield impressing in the Three Steps to Victory, over three different distances which included a track record over 660 metres. Laurels champion Mileheight Alba defeated Pinpoint Maxi in the final of the William Hill Classic and Ballymac Vic gained a deserved big race victory in the Champions Stakes.

In December Peterborough won the SIS/BAGS track championship final, the event at Nottingham went down to the final race when Peterborough runner Bobs Belter took fifth place in a photo finish which resulted in a one-point win.

Cornamaddy Jumbo winner of the Grand National, Springbok and Champion Hurdle was voted Greyhound of the Year and his trainer Mark Wallis lifted the Trainer of the Year award for the sixth time surpassing Linda Mullins.

News
The GBGB allowed equal distribution of seeds in open races. Bob Rowe the GRA chief Racing Manager retired and received a special award for services to greyhound racing and the greatest Irish trainer of all time Ger McKenna died. Harlow and former Oxford trainer Maurice Massey also died and Westmead Hawk who had been retired from stud duties died in May.

A €2.8 million rise in funding for the Irish greyhound industry was assigned in the 2015 budget. This increase from €10.8m to €13.6m would be put to use by IGB chairman Phil Meaney  but soon after they announced that they would be closing Harolds Cross, due to financial cut backs, in the future.

Roll of honour

Principal UK finals

Principal Irish finals

References 

Greyhound racing in the United Kingdom
Greyhound racing in the Republic of Ireland
Greyhound Racing Year
Greyhound Racing Year